Simon Kollerup (born 20 May 1986 in Thisted) is a Danish politician, who is a member of the Folketing for the Social Democrats political party. He has been serving as Minister of Economic and Business Affairs in the Frederiksen Cabinet since 2019.

Political career
Kollerup has been a member of Folketinget since the 2011 elections. He was appointed Minister of Economic and Business Affairs in the cabinet of Prime Minister Mette Frederiksen from 27 June 2019.

In 2020, Kollerup publicly criticized a decision by Danske Bank’s mortgage provider to double the downpayment required for home buyers amid the COVID-19 pandemic in Denmark.

Other activities
 European Investment Bank (EIB), Ex-Officio Member of the Board of Governors (since 2019)
 European Bank for Reconstruction and Development (EBRD), Ex-Officio Member of the Board of Governors (since 2019)
 Nordic Investment Bank (NIB), Ex-Officio Member of the Board of Governors (since 2019)

References

External links 
 Biography on the website of the Danish Parliament (Folketinget)

1986 births
Living people
People from Thisted
Government ministers of Denmark
Social Democrats (Denmark) politicians
Members of the Folketing 2011–2015
Members of the Folketing 2015–2019
Members of the Folketing 2019–2022
Members of the Folketing 2022–2026